The Pico Rivera Memorial Sports Arena is a multipurpose arena located in Pico Rivera, California in the United States. It can seat a range of 5000 to 6250 patrons, depending on the event configuration.

About
The arena is used for concerts, rodeos, professional wrestling and boxing. Notably, it used to host Circus Vargas during their tour of the West Coast. Famous for hosting many presentations of Antonio Aguilar, a Regional Mexican singer, and his family. Adjacent to Bicentennial Park is the 6,000 seat/10,000+ With Standing room. Pico Sports Arena, Famous for its Mexican Jaripeo / rodeos (charreadas & jaripeos) and Latin entertainment, the Pico Rivera Sports Arena is a popular recreation spot for the Los Angeles area Hispanic community. This facility was built in 1979 and is reputed to be the largest Mexican rodeo ring in the country. An average of 25 shows, preceded by a traditional Mexican rodeo, are held at the Sports Arena every year. 

As a concert venue, the Pico Rivera Sports Arena can seat up to 6,250.  With a  diameter arena floor, the arena is modeled after a Mexican rodeo ring. The arena, located at Bicentennial Park, is dedicated to Pico Rivera residents who fought for and served the United States during every war up to the Vietnam War.

External links
 Pico Rivera Sports Arena

Sports venues in Los Angeles County, California
Indoor arenas in California
Boxing venues in California
Wrestling venues in Los Angeles
Pico Rivera, California
Rodeo venues in the United States
1979 establishments in California
Sports venues completed in 1979